General Thomas Arthur Cooke  (1841–1912) was a British general whose career spanned the 19th and 20th centuries.

Cooke was gazetted into the 5th Regiment of Foot in 1862 before transferring to the 17th Lancers in 1866. From here he rose steadily and was mentioned in dispatches during the Anglo Zulu War. He assumed command of the regiment in 1886 and subsequently served in India (where he was awarded the Kaisar-i-Hind Medal for public service as President of the Plague Committee). Promotion to the rank of major general followed on 23 May 1898. 

In 1902 he was general officer in command of a camp which hosted many of the colonial troops visiting the United Kingdom for the Coronation of King Edward VII and Queen Alexandra, for which he was appointed a Commander of the Royal Victorian Order (CVO) two days after the ceremony, on 11 August 1902.

From 1906 to 1908 he was colonel of the 5th Royal Irish Lancers.

He was buried at Kensal Cemetery in a ceremony attended by many of his former comrades.

Notes

1841 births
1912 deaths
17th Lancers officers
British Army generals
Commanders of the Royal Victorian Order
British Army personnel of the Anglo-Zulu War
Burials at Kensal Green Cemetery
Recipients of the Kaisar-i-Hind Medal
Royal Northumberland Fusiliers officers